Zoran Savić (born November 18, 1966) is a Serbian professional basketball executive and former professional player who is currently the sports director for Partizan Belgrade of the Serbian KLS, the Adriatic League and the EuroLeague.

Professional career
Savić made first career steps as a basketball player with Čelik in the First League of Yugoslavia. In 1990 and 1991, he played with Jugoplastika in Split, winning the Triple crown (both the Yugoslav league title, the Yugoslav Cup and the FIBA European Champions Cup (now known as the EuroLeague), in each of those two years. In 1991, he left Yugoslavia and Pop 84, and signed with FC Barcelona, where he spent a couple of seasons with them playing in Spain's Liga ACB. In 1993, he reached with FC Barcelona, the semifinals of the FIBA Korać Cup, where they were eliminated by Virtus Roma and Dino Rađa.

Savić then became a member of PAOK Bravo in Greece. With PAOK, he won the FIBA Korać Cup in 1994, against Stefanel Trieste, and the Greek Cup against Chipita Panionios, in 1995. He then spent a year with the Spanish club Real Madrid, before settling in Italy, with Kinder Bologna, in 1996.

With Kinder Bologna, he won the Italian Cup in 1997, and the Italian LBA League championship, as well as the EuroLeague, in 1998. He was awarded with the EuroLeague Final Four MVP award of the 1998 EuroLeague Final Four. In the summer of 1998, he moved to the Turkish club Efes Pilsen, of Istanbul, and with them he won the Turkish Supercup.

Savić then returned to FC Barcelona in 2000, and then moved to the Italian club Skipper Bologna in 2001. In 2002, he ended his professional basketball playing career.

National team career

SFR Yugoslavia
Savić was a member of the senior SFR Yugoslav national team. With SFR Yugoslavia, he won a gold medal at the 1990 edition of the FIBA World Cup. He also won a gold medal at the 1991 edition of the FIBA EuroBasket.

FR Yugoslavia
Savić also represented the senior FR Yugoslav national team. As a member of FR Yugoslavia's national team, he won a gold medal at the 1995 EuroBasket. He was also a part of FR Yugoslavia's silver medal team at the 1996 Atlanta Summer Olympics.

Savić also won the gold medal at the 1997 EuroBasket.

Post-playing career
After retiring from playing at Fortitudo Bologna in 2002, Savić became part of the club's management. He spent three years as the team's general manager. From 2005 until 2008, he was the general manager of FC Barcelona Bàsquet. From 2008 to 2009, he managed Fortitudo. Savić then became a sports agent, founding Invictus Sports Group.

On 16 March 2021, Partizan hired Savić as their new sports director.

References

External links
Zoran Savić at acb.com 
Zoran Savić at fiba.com
Zoran Savić at fibaeurope.com
Zoran Savić at legabasket.it 
Zoran Savić at tblstat.net

1966 births
Living people
Anadolu Efes S.K. players
Basketball players at the 1996 Summer Olympics
Bosnia and Herzegovina expatriate basketball people in Serbia
Centers (basketball)
FC Barcelona Bàsquet players
FIBA EuroBasket-winning players
FIBA World Championship-winning players
Fortitudo Pallacanestro Bologna players
Greek Basket League players
KK Split players
Liga ACB players
Medalists at the 1996 Summer Olympics
Olympic basketball players of Yugoslavia
Olympic medalists in basketball
Olympic silver medalists for Serbia and Montenegro
P.A.O.K. BC players
Sportspeople from Zenica
Real Madrid Baloncesto players
Serbian basketball executives and administrators
Serbian expatriate basketball people in Croatia
Serbian expatriate basketball people in Greece
Serbian expatriate basketball people in Italy
Serbian expatriate basketball people in Spain
Serbian expatriate basketball people in Turkey
Serbian men's basketball players
Serbian sports agents
Serbs of Bosnia and Herzegovina
Virtus Bologna players
Yugoslav men's basketball players
1990 FIBA World Championship players